Deh-e Now-ye Ali Shahri (also Romanized as Deh-e Now-ye ‘Alī Shahrī) is a village in Horjand Rural District, Kuhsaran District, Ravar County, Kerman Province, Iran. At the 2006 census, its population was 62, in 17 families.

References 

Populated places in Ravar County